Lligwy Bay is a bay of the Welsh island of Anglesey.

It is on the north east of the island, to the north of the village of Moelfre. It was the site, in October 1859, of the loss of the steam clipper Royal Charter with a loss of life in excess of 450.

The bay is very popular with windsurfers and other windpowered watersport enthusiasts. There is a pay and display car park at the end of the access road from the A5025 at Brynrefail.

See also 
Capel Lligwy
Din Lligwy
Lligwy Burial Chamber
Royal Charter Storm

References

External links 
 Location map, Traeth Lligwy Beach
 Moelfre, Lligwy and Dulas

Moelfre, Anglesey
Bays of Anglesey